Fagot is a surname. Notable people with this surname include:

Emilio Fagot (1883 – 1946), Puerto Rican politician
Jean-Noël Fagot (born 1958), French ice speed skater
Paul Fagot (1842 – 1908), French malacologist
Samuel Pierre Auguste Fagot (1797 – 1858), builder of the Uncle Sam Plantation
Véronique Fagot, 1977 Miss France